The Helen Lab Theatre is a theater on Euclid Avenue in downtown Cleveland, Ohio, part of Playhouse Square. The smallest of three venues used by the Cleveland State University Department of Theatre and Dance and Cleveland Play House.

References

Theatres in Cleveland
Movie palaces
1921 establishments in Ohio
Cleveland State University